Vyacheslav Vladimirovich Nagovitsyn (Wyaçĭesláw Nagowícïn); born 2 March 1956) is a Russian politician. He has served as a Senator from Buryatia since 2017, and was previously the Head of the Republic of Buryatia, a federal subject of Russia. He held the office from 10 July 2007 to 7 February 2017. Nagovitsyn is a member of the  United Russia party and resigned from office after he decided against running for a third term.

Biography
Nagovitsyn was born in Glazov, a village in the Udmurt ASSR, Russian SFSR, Soviet Union. He spent most of his life in Tomsk. In 1978, he graduated from Tomsk Polytechnical Institute, specialising in Mechanical Engineering. He had, during university, received higher education in economics. Nagovistyn took a series of low paying jobs until he was employed as an engineer. In 1986 he was appointed as the chief engineer of a factory in Tomsk, later becoming the general director. He began his political career in December 1999, when he became Mayor of Tomsk for a short period of time. Since 2002 he has been the Chairman of the Co-ordination Council Forestry and Agriculture. In 2007 he was nominated and elected president of Buryatia.

He is married and has two sons and one daughter. He also has two grandchildren.

References

 Biography of Nagovitsyn  
 Official Site  

1956 births
Living people
People from Glazov
United Russia politicians
21st-century Russian politicians
Tomsk Polytechnic University alumni
Heads of the Republic of Buryatia
Members of the Federation Council of Russia (after 2000)